The Stockings (also known as Rip Torn & The Stockings) were a short lived Australian New Wave music band formed in 1979. The group's self-titled debut EP was recorded at Sweetcorn Studios in Perth. The group released one studio album, which peaked at number 93 on the Australian charts in 1981.

Discography

Albums

EPs

Singles

References

Australian pop music groups
Musical groups established in 1979
Musical groups disestablished in 1982